The Robert Treat Paine Estate, known as Stonehurst, is a country house set on  in Waltham, Massachusetts.  It was designed for philanthropist Robert Treat Paine (1835-1910) in a collaboration between architect Henry Hobson Richardson and landscape architect Frederick Law Olmsted. It is located at 100 Robert Treat Paine Drive. Since 1974 the estate has been owned by the City of Waltham and its grounds kept as a public park, and is believed to be the only residential collaboration by Richardson and Olmsted that is open to the public.

History
In 1866, Boston lawyer Robert Treat Paine Jr. and his wife Lydia (Lyman) commissioned architect Gridley James Fox Bryant to build a mansarded Second Empire summer house in Waltham. The house and its site were paid for by George Lyman, Lydia's father and owner of an adjacent summer residence, the Lyman Estate.  This house was deemed too small for the Paines and their seven children. In October 1883, Richardson and Olmsted made their first visit to the property to discuss relocating the house and expanding it. In July 1884, Olmsted and Richardson produced sketches for a new site atop a rocky ridge with sweeping views to the southeast.  In the spring of 1885, construction began  while the Paine family traveled to Europe with Phillips Brooks, a family friend and pastor of Trinity Church in Boston.  When Richardson died at age 47 in April 1886, the commission was close to completion. The terrace and some interior finishes were completed over the summer.

Robert Treat Paine Jr. died in 1910, and the Paine family continued to occupy the house until the mid-1960s.  In 1974 Theodore Lyman Storer donated the  property to the city of Waltham.

Episode #2104 of This Old House featured a tour of the estate.

Image gallery

See also
List of National Historic Landmarks in Massachusetts
National Register of Historic Places listings in Waltham, Massachusetts

References

Bibliography
Margaret Henderson Floyd, "H. H. Richardson, Frederick Law Olmsted, and the House for Robert Treat Paine", Winterthur Portfolio, Vol. 18, No. 4 (Winter, 1983), pp. 227–248.
Ann Clifford and Thomas M. Paine. Stonehurst, The Robert Treat Paine Estate: An American Masterwork by H.H. Richardson and F.L. Olmsted. Waltham, Massachusetts: Robert Treat Paine Historical Trust, 2007.

External links

Stonehurst

Historic house museums in Massachusetts
Paine Estate
Richardsonian Romanesque architecture in Massachusetts
Houses in Waltham, Massachusetts
National Historic Landmarks in Massachusetts
Houses completed in 1866
Museums in Middlesex County, Massachusetts
Houses on the National Register of Historic Places in Waltham, Massachusetts
1866 establishments in Massachusetts